Kova may refer to:

Kava, Iran
Kovu, similarly pronounced name